Chinese rice wine may refer to:

 Mijiu, made from glutinous rice
 Huangjiu, made from rice or other grains through a different process